Jan Chytrý (born February 8, 1917, date of death unknown) was a Czech boxer who competed for Czechoslovakia in the 1936 Summer Olympics. In 1936 he was eliminated in the first round of the lightweight class after losing his fight to Hidekichi Nagamatsu.

External links
Jan Chytrý's profile at Sports Reference.com

1917 births
Year of death missing
Czechoslovak male boxers
Lightweight boxers
Olympic boxers of Czechoslovakia
Boxers at the 1936 Summer Olympics
Czech male boxers